English actor Andy Serkis has been featured in various films, television series, and video games. Serkis started acting in the late 1980s with small roles on the television series Morris Minor and His Marvellous Motors (1989), and The New Statesman (1989) before being cast as Owen in Streetwise from 1989–1992. He then appeared in films such as Prince of Jutland (1994), Career Girls (1997), Pandaemonium (2000). In 2001, he was cast as the voice of Gollum in Peter Jackson's epic fantasy adventure film The Lord of the Rings: The Fellowship of the Ring. Serkis reprised this role in the sequels The Lord of the Rings: The Two Towers (2002) and The Lord of the Rings: The Return of the King (2003) as well as the 2012 prequel The Hobbit: An Unexpected Journey. During that time, he also co-starred in the films The Escapist (2002), 13 Going on 30 (2004) and lent his voice to the 2006 computer-animated film Flushed Away.

In 2011, he provided the voice and motion capture for Caesar in the science fiction film Rise of the Planet of the Apes. He provided voice and motion capture for the role again in the 2014 sequel and the 2017 final film of the trilogy. His other voice and motion capture work includes King Bohan in the 2007 video game Heavenly Sword, Kong in Peter Jackson's 2005 film King Kong, and Supreme Leader Snoke in Star Wars: The Force Awakens (2015), Star Wars: The Last Jedi (2017), and Star Wars: The Rise of Skywalker (2019).

Film

Filmmaking credits
Director
 Breathe (2017)
 Mowgli: Legend of the Jungle (2018)
 Venom: Let There Be Carnage (2021)
 Animal Farm (TBA) (Also producer)

Executive producer
 Sex & Drugs & Rock & Roll (2010)
 The Ritual (2017)
 No One Gets Out Alive (2021)
 Next Goal Wins (2023)

Second unit director
  (2012)
  (2013)
  (2014)

Motion capture consultant
 Godzilla (2014)
 Avengers: Age of Ultron (2015)

Television

Video games

Stage

Audiobooks

See also
 List of awards and nominations received by Andy Serkis

References

External links 
 

Male actor filmographies
British filmographies
Filmography